SP-303 may refer to:
 SP-303 (Brazil), a highway in Brazil
 Boss SP-303, a digital sampler 
 USS George P. Squires (SP-303), a U.S. Navy patrol vessel and minesweeper